Jamie Lee Curtis (born November 22, 1958) is an American actress, producer, and children's author. Known for her performances in the horror and slasher genres, she is regarded as a scream queen, in addition to roles in comedies. Curtis has received multiple accolades, including an Academy Award, a BAFTA, two Golden Globes, and two Screen Actors Guild Awards, as well as nominations for an Emmy and a Grammy.

Curtis came to prominence with the ABC sitcom Operation Petticoat (1977–1978). She made her feature film debut playing Laurie Strode in John Carpenter's slasher film Halloween (1978), which established her as a scream queen and led to a string of parts in horror films such as The Fog, Prom Night, Terror Train (all 1980), and Roadgames (1981). She reprised the role of Laurie in the Halloween franchise, until 2022.

Curtis's film work spans many genres outside of horror, including the comedies Trading Places (1983), for which she won a BAFTA for Best Supporting Actress, and A Fish Called Wanda (1988), for which she received a nomination for the BAFTA for Best Actress. Her role as a workout instructor in the film Perfect (1985) earned her a reputation as a sex symbol. She won a Golden Globe Award for her portrayal of Helen Tasker in James Cameron's True Lies (1994). Her other notable film credits include Freaky Friday (2003) and Knives Out (2019). Her performance in Everything Everywhere All at Once (2022) won her the Academy Award for Best Supporting Actress. She received a star on the Hollywood Walk of Fame in 1998. As of 2021, her films have grossed over $2.3 billion at the box office.

Curtis received a Golden Globe and a People's Choice Award for her portrayal of Hannah Miller on ABC's  Anything But Love (1989–1992), and earned a Primetime Emmy nomination for the television film Nicholas' Gift (1998). She also starred as Cathy Munsch on the Fox series Scream Queens (2015–16), for which she received her seventh Golden Globe nomination. Curtis has written numerous children's books, including Today I Feel Silly, and Other Moods That Make My Day (1998), which made The New York Times best-seller list. Curtis is a daughter of actors Janet Leigh and Tony Curtis. She is married to British-American filmmaker Christopher Guest, with whom she has two adopted children. 

Her marriage to Guest, who holds the British title of 5th Baron Haden-Guest, makes her a baroness who is entitled to use the name "The Right Honourable The Lady Haden-Guest", though she opts not to use it.

Early life

Jamie Lee Curtis was born in Santa Monica, California, on November 22, 1958, the daughter of actors Janet Leigh (born Jeanette Helen Morrison; 1927–2004) and Tony Curtis (born Bernard Schwartz; 1925–2010). Her mother was of Danish, German, and Scotch-Irish descent. Her father was Jewish, a son of emigrants from Mátészalka, Hungary. She has an older sister, actress Kelly Curtis (born 1956), and four half-siblings from her father's later marriages: Alexandra, actress Allegra Curtis (born 1966), Benjamin, and Nicholas (who died of a drug overdose in 1994).

Curtis's parents divorced in 1962. She has stated that, after the divorce, her father was "not around" and that he was "not interested in being a father". After her father's death, she learned that she and her siblings had all been cut out of his will. Her mother married stockbroker Robert Brandt, who helped raise her. Curtis attended the elite Harvard-Westlake School and Beverly Hills High School in Los Angeles, and graduated in 1976 from Choate Rosemary Hall in Wallingford, Connecticut. Returning to California in 1976, she studied law at her mother's alma mater—University of the Pacific in Stockton, California—but dropped out after one semester to pursue an acting career.

Acting career

Film performances

Curtis's film debut occurred in John Carpenter's 1978 horror film Halloween, in which she played the role of Laurie Strode. The film was a major success and was considered the highest-grossing independent film of its time, earning accolades as a classic horror film. The producer, Debra Hill, specifically cast Curtis because her mother, Janet Leigh, had been known as a horror icon due to her Oscar-nominated performance in Psycho. Curtis was subsequently cast in several horror films, garnering her a reputation as a scream queen. She would also return to the Halloween franchise seven times, playing Strode in the sequels Halloween II (1981), Halloween H20: 20 Years Later (1998), Halloween: Resurrection (2002), Halloween (2018), Halloween Kills (2021), and Halloween Ends (2022), and having an uncredited voice role in Halloween III: Season of the Witch (1982).

Her next film following Halloween was The Fog, which was also helmed by Carpenter and produced by Hill. The film opened in February 1980 to mixed reviews but strong box office, starting Curtis as a horror film starlet. In the years since its release, the film has achieved critical reappraisal and developed a cult following. Her next film, Prom Night, was a low-budget Canadian slasher film released in July 1980. The film, for which she earned a Genie Award nomination for Best Performance by a Foreign Actress, was similar in style to Halloween, yet received negative reviews which marked it as a disposable entry in the then-popular slasher genre. That year, Curtis also starred in Terror Train, which opened in October and met with negative reviews akin to Prom Night. Both films performed moderately well at the box office. Curtis's roles in the latter two films served a similar function to that of Strode—the main character whose friends are murdered and is practically the only protagonist to survive. Film critic Roger Ebert, who gave negative reviews to all three of Curtis's 1980 films, said that Curtis "is to the current horror film glut what Christopher Lee was to the last one—or Boris Karloff was in the 1930s." In 1981, she appeared alongside Stacey Keach in the Australian thriller film Roadgames, directed by Carpenter's friend Richard Franklin; her importation, which was requested by the film's American distributor AVCO Embassy Pictures, was contested by the Sydney branch of Actors Equity. Although the film was a box office bomb in Australia and Franklin later regretted not increasing the size of Curtis's role, it has achieved a cult following and was championed by Quentin Tarantino. For her work in the horror film genre, Curtis was inducted into the Fangoria Hall of Fame in 1997.

Her role in 1983's Trading Places helped Curtis shed her horror queen image; the film was a great critical and commercial success and garnered Curtis a BAFTA Award for Best Actress in a Supporting Role. She then starred in the 1988 comedy film A Fish Called Wanda, which achieved cult status while showcasing her as a comedic actress. For her performance, she was nominated for the BAFTA Award for Best Actress in a Leading Role and the Golden Globe Award for Best Actress – Motion Picture Comedy or Musical. Curtis received positive reviews for her performance in the action thriller Blue Steel (1990), which was directed by Kathryn Bigelow. She also received a Golden Globe Award for her work in the 1994 action-comedy film True Lies, directed by James Cameron. The film was a critical and commercial success, becoming the 3rd highest grossing film of 1994. Curtis appeared in Fierce Creatures in 1997, opposite her three A Fish Called Wanda costars: John Cleese, Kevin Kline, and Michael Palin. While the film was a modest commercial success, grossing $40 million worldwide against a $25 million budget, it did not achieve the level of critical acclaim of its predecessor.

Her other film roles also include the coming-of-age films My Girl (1991) and My Girl 2 (1994), the psychological thriller Mother's Boys (1993), and the Disney comedy film Freaky Friday (2003), opposite Lindsay Lohan. The latter was filmed at Palisades High School in Pacific Palisades, California, near where Curtis and Guest lived with their children. Curtis received critical acclaim for her performance in the film and was nominated for a Golden Globe Award for Best Actress – Motion Picture Comedy or Musical. She starred in the Christmas comedy film Christmas with the Kranks (2004), which was critically derided but a box office success, and later went on to gain a cult following.

In October 2006, Curtis told Access Hollywood that she had closed the book on her acting career to focus on her family. She returned to acting after being cast in June 2007 in Disney's live-action-animated film Beverly Hills Chihuahua, co-starring opposite Piper Perabo as one of three live-action characters in the film. She also starred in the 2010 comedy film You Again, opposite Kristen Bell and Sigourney Weaver. Curtis had voice roles in the animated films The Little Engine That Could (2011) and From Up on Poppy Hill (2011). This was followed by supporting roles in the neo-noir mystery film Veronica Mars (2014) and the biographical drama film Spare Parts (2015). In 2016, IndieWire named her one of the best actors never to have received an Academy Award nomination (Curtis received her first Academy Award nomination in 2023).

Curtis returned to leading roles with her reprisal of Laurie Strode in the horror sequel film Halloween (2018). The film debuted to $76.2 million, marking the second-best opening weekend of October and the highest opening weekend of the Halloween franchise; and became the biggest domestic grosser in the franchise with its opening weekend alone. Its opening performance was the best-ever for a film starring a lead actress over 55 years old. Curtis's performance earned critical acclaim. Also in 2018, she had a role in the drama film An Acceptable Loss. She then starred as Linda Drysdale-Thrombrey in Rian Johnson's mystery film Knives Out, which earned critical acclaim and over $300 million at the global box office.

In September 2021, she was honored with the Golden Lion at the Venice Film Festival for her lifetime achievements. Curtis again reprised her role as Laurie Strode in the horror sequels Halloween Kills, which was released in October 2021, and in Halloween Ends, which was released in October 2022. Halloween Ends marked Curtis' final time portraying Laurie Strode. She also appeared as Deirdre Beaubeirdre in the comedy-drama action film Everything Everywhere All at Once (2022), which earned her Academy Award, BAFTA, Golden Globe, Independent Spirit, and Screen Actors Guild Award nominations for Best Supporting Actress; it was notably her first Oscar nomination. She ultimately won the Academy Award and SAG Award, marking her first time winning both, as well as being part of the cast's win for Best Ensemble at the Screen Actors Guild Awards. She will portray Dr. Patricia Tannis in the video game adaptation Borderlands, and will also appear as Madame Leota in Disney's Haunted Mansion, which will be released in July 2023.

Television performances
Curtis made her television debut in a 1977 episode of the drama series Quincy, M.E.. She went on to guest star on several series, including Columbo, Charlie's Angels and Buck Rogers in the 25th Century. She appeared as Nurse Lt. Barbara Duran in the short-lived comedy series Operation Petticoat (1977–1978), based on the 1959 film that starred her father, Tony Curtis. Curtis was also a gameshow panelist on several episodes of Match Game.

Curtis starred in the 1981 television film Death of a Centerfold: The Dorothy Stratten Story, playing the eponymous doomed Playmate. She earned a Golden Globe Award nomination for her work in TNT's adaptation of the Wendy Wasserstein play The Heidi Chronicles. Her first starring role on television came opposite Richard Lewis in the situation comedy series Anything But Love, which ran for four seasons from 1989 through 1992. For her performance as Hannah Miller, she received a People's Choice Award and the Golden Globe Award for Best Actress – Television Series Musical or Comedy. Curtis also appeared in a 1996 episode of the sitcom The Drew Carey Show. In 1998, she starred in the CBS television film Nicholas' Gift, for which she received an Primetime Emmy Award nomination.

In 2012, she appeared in five episodes of the military drama series NCIS, playing the role of Dr. Samantha Ryan, a potential romantic interest of Special Agent Gibbs (Mark Harmon). During an interview, she stated that if they could develop a storyline, she would be interested to return to the series, but this never occurred. The series reunited Curtis with Harmon, after he played her character's fiancé and later husband in the 2003 remake of Freaky Friday.

From 2012 to 2018, Curtis had a recurring role as Joan Day, the mother of Zooey Deschanel's character, in the sitcom New Girl. From 2015 to 2016, Curtis had a lead role as Cathy Munsch on the Fox satirical horror comedy series Scream Queens, which aired for two seasons. For her performance, she was nominated for the Golden Globe Award for Best Actress – Television Series Musical or Comedy.

Other ventures

Children's books
Working with illustrator Laura Cornell, Curtis has written a number of children's books, all published by HarperCollins Children's Books.

When I Was Little: A Four-Year Old's Memoir of Her Youth, 1993.
Tell Me Again About The Night I was Born, 1996.
 Today I Feel Silly, and Other Moods That Make My Day, 1998; listed on the New York Times best-seller list for 10 weeks.
Where Do Balloons Go?: An Uplifting Mystery, 2000.
I'm Gonna Like Me: Letting Off a Little Self-Esteem, 2002.
It's Hard to Be Five: Learning How to Work My Control Panel, 2004.
Is There Really a Human Race?, 2006.
Big Words for Little People, 2008.
My Friend Jay, 2009, edition of one, presented to Jay Leno
My Mommy Hung the Moon: A Love Story, 2010.
My Brave Year of Firsts, 2016.
This Is Me: A Story of Who We Are and Where We Came From, 2016.
Me, Myselfie & I: A Cautionary Tale, 2018.

Invention
In 1987, Curtis filed a US patent application that subsequently issued as Patent No. 4,753,647. This is a modification of a diaper with a moisture-proof pocket containing wipes that can be taken out and used with one hand. Curtis refused to allow her invention to be marketed until companies started selling biodegradable diapers. The full statutory term of this patent expired February 20, 2007, and it is now in the public domain. She filed a second US patent application related to disposable diapers in 2016 which issued as US Patent 9,827,151 on November 28, 2017, and will expire on September 7, 2036.

Blogging
Curtis was a blogger for The Huffington Post online newspaper from 2011 to 2017. On her website, Curtis tells her young readers that she "moonlights as an actor, photographer, and closet organizer".

Podcasts
Curtis launched the podcast series Letters from Camp on Audible in 2020 and Good Friend with Jamie Lee Curtis for iHeartRadio in 2021.

Political views
During California's 2008 general election, Curtis appeared in the "Yes on Prop 3" television advertisements.

In March 2012, Curtis was featured with Martin Sheen and Brad Pitt in a performance of Dustin Lance Black's play 8—a staged reenactment of the federal trial that overturned California's Prop 8 ban on same-sex marriage—as Sandy Stier. The production was held at the Wilshire Ebell Theatre and broadcast on YouTube to raise money for the American Foundation for Equal Rights. In June 2016, the Human Rights Campaign released a video in tribute to the victims of the Orlando nightclub shooting; in the video, Curtis and others told the stories of the people killed there.

Curtis endorsed Hillary Clinton in the 2016 presidential election; she has since been a vocal critic of former President Donald Trump.

Philanthropy
Beginning in 1990, Curtis and her father, Tony, took a renewed interest in their family's Hungarian Jewish heritage, and helped finance the rebuilding of the "Great Synagogue" in Budapest, Hungary. The largest synagogue in Europe, it was originally built in 1859 and suffered damage during World War II.

Curtis also helped to refurbish the synagogue in Mátészalka where her grandparents worshipped. She attended the opening of the Tony Curtis Memorial Museum and Cafe, which is also located in Mátészalka.

Curtis was guest of honor at the 11th annual gala and fundraiser in 2003 for Women in Recovery, a Venice, California-based non-profit organization offering a live-in, twelve-step program of rehabilitation for women in need. Past honorees of this organization include Sir Anthony Hopkins and Dame Angela Lansbury. Curtis is also involved in the work of the Children Affected by AIDS Foundation, serving as the annual host for the organization's "Dream Halloween" event in Los Angeles, launched every year in October.

Curtis plays a leadership role for Children's Hospital Los Angeles and supported the 2011 opening of a new inpatient facility for the organization.

Personal life

Curtis married British-American filmmaker Christopher Guest on December 18, 1984. She saw a picture of him from his film This Is Spinal Tap in Rolling Stone and told her friend Debra Hill, "Oh, I'm going to marry that guy." She married him five months later. They have two adopted daughters: Annie, born in 1986, and Ruby, born in 1996. Curtis is actor Jake Gyllenhaal's godmother. Prior to her marriage to Guest, Curtis dated British rock singer Adam Ant.

Her father-in-law was a British hereditary peer, Peter Haden-Guest, 4th Baron Haden-Guest; when he died on April 8, 1996, her husband succeeded him, becoming the 5th Baron Haden-Guest and making her The Right Honourable the Lady Haden-Guest. Curtis does not use this title, saying, "it has nothing to do with me".

She is close friends with actress Sigourney Weaver. In a 2015 interview, she said she has never watched Weaver's film Alien in its entirety because she was too scared by it.

Curtis is a recovering alcoholic, and was once addicted to painkillers that she began using after a cosmetic surgical procedure. She became sober from opiates in 1999 after reading and relating to Tom Chiarella's account of addiction, and has called her own recovery the greatest achievement of her life. She is a fan of the video game World of Warcraft and the manga One Piece, and has worn disguises that allowed her to attend Comic-Con, EVO, and BlizzCon incognito.

In 2021, Curtis received the Lifetime Achievement Award during the 78th Venice International Film Festival and said, "I feel so alive, like I'm this 14-year-old person just beginning their life. That's how I wake up every day with that sort of joy and purpose. I'm just beginning my work."

Acting credits and awards

References

External links

 for Jamie Lee Curtis & Laura Cornell books

 
 

1958 births
Living people
20th-century American actresses
21st-century American actresses
Activists from California
Actresses from Los Angeles
Actresses from Santa Monica, California
American children's writers
American film actresses
American people of Danish descent
American people of German descent
American people of Hungarian-Jewish descent
American people of Scotch-Irish descent
American philanthropists
American television actresses
American voice actresses
Best Musical or Comedy Actress Golden Globe (film) winners
Best Musical or Comedy Actress Golden Globe (television) winners
Best Supporting Actress BAFTA Award winners
Haden-Guest
California Democrats
Choate Rosemary Hall alumni
Haden-Guest family
Outstanding Performance by a Cast in a Motion Picture Screen Actors Guild Award winners
Outstanding Performance by a Female Actor in a Supporting Role Screen Actors Guild Award winners
University of the Pacific (United States) alumni
Women inventors
Writers from Santa Monica, California
Best Supporting Actress Academy Award winners